The NBA Summer League, also known as the Las Vegas Summer League, is an off-season competition organized by the National Basketball Association. NBA teams come together to try out different summer rosters instead of their regular season line-ups, including rookie, sophomore and G League affiliate players.  The current NBA Summer League also features the California Classic and the Salt Lake City Summer League. 

In previous years, the Utah Jazz Summer League also featured NBA teams, as did the Orlando Pro Summer League; those leagues are sometimes referred to as NBA Summer League when also mentioned with its host location.

History
Summer leagues have existed for decades. Historically, there was not an organized structure, with leagues sometimes overlapping and not officially coordinated. The Orlando Pro Summer League was held from 2002 to 2017, operating each year except in 2005 and 2011. In 2004, the league held the Las Vegas Summer League for the first time; it is by far the largest league, with 32 teams participating as of 2019. The Utah Jazz Summer League began play in 2015, replacing the Rocky Mountain Revue, an event held from 1984 to 2008 before going on a lengthy hiatus due to declining participation.

The leagues generally consist of a handful of games per team. Unlike regulation NBA games, which are 48 minutes long, games only last 40 minutes (same as in FIBA/WNBA), plus multiple 5-minute overtime periods (first overtime is played in its entirety; true sudden death thereafter). Before the 2013 leagues, no official champions were named at any league, with the leagues focusing more on individual auditions and development. A champion is currently named for the Las Vegas league, although team performance is generally not emphasized.

Unsigned free agents are often signed to summer league deals, providing a chance to possibly be signed to a contract during the regular season. Any team can sign the free agent after the league is over, not just the one he played for in summer league. For example, Jeremy Lin, a Harvard graduate, was invited to play for the Dallas Mavericks summer league team despite being undrafted earlier in the year. In the 2010 summer league, Lin performed well and was later signed by the Golden State Warriors.

Orlando Pro Summer League
The Orlando Pro Summer League was held from 2002 to 2017, operating each year except in 2005 and 2011. Hosted by the Orlando Magic, its games were closed to the public and could only be seen on television. The league named a champion for the first time in 2013 when the Oklahoma City Thunder defeated the Houston Rockets 85–77. On July 11, 2014, the Philadelphia 76ers won the championship with a 91–75 victory over the Memphis Grizzlies. The Dallas Mavericks were the final champions of the league, winning in 2017. The league ended after 2017 due to the trend of NBA teams participating in the Las Vegas league.

Las Vegas Summer League
The Las Vegas Summer League played its inaugural season in 2004 University of Nevada, Las Vegas (UNLV)'s arena, the Thomas & Mack Center with six NBA teams – Boston Celtics, Cleveland Cavaliers, Denver Nuggets, Orlando Magic, Phoenix Suns, and Washington Wizards – playing a total of 13 games. With Warren LeGarie leading the way, the summer league had three successful summers in which participation increased to 16 teams playing more than 40 games at UNLV. In 2007, the NBA attached its name to the event, making it the "NBA" summer league. In 2008, the summer league expanded to 22 teams and was sponsored by EA Sports. As of the summer 2015 season, Samsung is the sponsor and the official sponsored branding is the "Samsung NBA Summer League". Since 2018, all NBA teams play in the Las Vegas Summer League in the typical tournament style.

Salt Lake City Summer League 
From 1984 until 2008, the Utah Jazz hosted a tournament known as the Rocky Mountain Revue. Launched as a community outreach campaign to encourage interest in the Jazz in the summer of 1984 under the direction of Jazz public relations staffers David Allred and Kim Turner, initially the league operated as a three-week, pro-am league in July with alumni players from Utah, BYU, Weber State and Utah State.

In 1990, after sending a team to the California Summer League the previous summer, Scott Layden, then the Jazz's director of basketball operations, invited the Portland Trail Blazers, Phoenix Suns, and Sacramento Kings to join the league and moved to an all-NBA format. Over the course of the next 20 years, as few as four teams (1990) and as many as 16 teams (1998), participated, including the first International entry, Burghy Roma. The league did not play games during the 1999 strike-shortened season.  In 2008, the NBA Development League had a D-League Ambassadors team. The Rocky Mountain Revue also showcased the Iranian national team.

Games were hosted at Westminster College (Salt Lake City), East High School (Salt Lake City), Delta Center and the Revue's final home, Salt Lake Community College. The Revue was known for its popularity, evidenced by sold-out crowds each time the Jazz played. The Revue was one of the first NBA summer leagues to feature NBA officials, as the NBA used the league for referee development and training. The only NBA teams that did not send a team to the Revue at least once were the Los Angeles Lakers, Detroit Pistons and Washington Wizards.

Due to declining participation, the event was cancelled for the 2009 season. However, the Jazz confirmed in November 2014 that they would revive the Utah Jazz Summer League for 2015, albeit with a smaller number of teams participating. The event included the Boston Celtics, Philadelphia 76ers, and San Antonio Spurs as well as the Jazz in a six-game, four-day event at EnergySolutions Arena.

In 2019, the Utah Jazz Summer League announced some changes in the event, replacing its name as Salt Lake City Summer League. The rebranding also included a new logo, as well as a new court design based on the team's popular City Edition court.

California Classic Summer League
On May 6, 2018, reports surfaced that to replace the position previously held in Orlando by the Magic, the Kings would host its own Summer League event in Sacramento. The event is scheduled to take place before the Las Vegas Summer League begins, with the teams in place for the event involving the Sacramento Kings, Los Angeles Lakers, Golden State Warriors, and Miami Heat. Eight days later, the Kings confirmed that their own Summer League event (titled the California Classic Summer League) would take place from July 2–5, 2018 (taking a day off to celebrate the Fourth of July), replacing the Orlando Pro Summer League. On May 14, 2018, the Sacramento Kings confirmed that report.

For the 2019 event, the Kings announced the team's roster for their second annual California Classic Summer League that took place on July 1–3 at Golden 1 Center. It featured a four-team format that included a double-header match-up per day featuring the Kings, Golden State Warriors, Los Angeles Lakers and Miami Heat.

Las Vegas MVP winners
The award winner's team represented who they played for at the time they won Summer League MVP.

Champions

See also

Reebok Pro Summer League, former summer basketball league in Boston, Massachusetts 
Summer Pro League, former summer basketball league in Long Beach, California

References

External links
 NBA Summer League home

 
Basketball leagues in the United States